Black Cop is a Canadian drama film, which premiered at the 2017 Toronto International Film Festival. The full-length directorial debut of actor Cory Bowles, the film is an expansion of his earlier short film of the same name.

The film stars Ronnie Rowe as a Black Canadian police officer who himself  becomes the victim of racial profiling, and takes revenge on his community.

In February 2018, the film was picked up by Samuel Goldwyn Films for distribution in the United States.

Plot

Part 1 
The film starts off with an African Canadian cop (Ronnie Rowe) recalling his childhood. When he was young, a little boy called him a name relating to a candy bar and he did nothing. After hearing this offensive name multiple times he eventually responded with picking up his textbook and beating him over the head with it. During this part he makes remarks on how his race alienates him because he is a cop: His father (who died before he got his badge) told his son that if you are ever stopped by the police even for the time you should put your hands up and freeze. He ends this part by saying that he never really did listen to his father.

Awards and accolades
At the 2017 Vancouver International Film Festival, Black Cop won the award for Best Canadian Film. At the 6th Canadian Screen Awards in 2018, the film won the John Dunning Discovery Award.

Bowles received a nomination for the Directors Guild of Canada's DGC Discovery Award in 2017.

References

External links
 
 

2017 films
Canadian crime drama films
Black Canadian films
English-language Canadian films
Films shot in Halifax, Nova Scotia
Films about racism
2010s English-language films
2010s Canadian films